Iuliu is a Romanian male given name derived from Latin Iulius. The female form is Iulia. In other cases Iuliu is the Romanianized form of the Hungarian name Gyula.

People named Iuliu:
Iuliu Barasch
Iuliu Baratky
Iuliu Bodola
Iuliu Coroianu
Iuliu Hațieganu
Iuliu Ilyés
Iuliu Maniu
Iuliu Cezar Săvescu
Iuliu Szöcs
Iuliu Winkler

See also
 Julius (given name)

Romanian masculine given names